Brassavola martiana is a species of orchid found in South Tropical America. It is reported from Brazil, Peru, Colombia, Venezuela, French Guiana, Guyana and Suriname.

References

External links 

martiana
Orchids of South America
Plants described in 1836